Liège–Bastogne–Liège, also known as La Doyenne ("The Old Lady"), is a one-day classic cycling race in Belgium. First run in 1892, it is the oldest of the five Monuments of the European professional road cycling calendar; usually coming as the last of the spring classics. It is held annually in late April, in the Ardennes region of Belgium, from Liège to Bastogne and back.

It is considered one of the most arduous one-day cycling events in the world because of its length and demanding course. The most successful rider with five victories is Belgian rider Eddy Merckx, trailed by Italian Moreno Argentin in the 1980s and Spaniard Alejandro Valverde in the 2000s, who both won the race four times.

Liège–Bastogne–Liège is part of the UCI World Tour competition. It is the concluding race of the Ardennes Classics series, which includes La Flèche Wallonne. Both are organised by French owner Amaury Sport Organisation, which also organises the Tour de France and Paris–Roubaix.

In 2017, the Liège–Bastogne–Liège Femmes was inaugurated and added to the UCI Women's World Tour, becoming the second of the cycling monuments to introduce a women's edition after the Tour of Flanders in 2014.

History

Spa-Bastogne-Spa
Like many of cycling's classics, Liège–Bastogne–Liège was first organized by a French-Belgian newspaper (L'Express). The route has always stayed in the southern, French-speaking (and hillier), part of Belgium where Liège and Bastogne are located.

The race had its first running for amateurs in 1892, from Spa to Bastogne and back, over a 250 km distance. As bicycles were expensive in the late 19th century, cycling was considered an exclusive sport for the wealthy, and the event was considered a "gentlemen's affair". 33 riders from the Liège cycling union and the Pesant Club Liégois, all Belgians and most of them from Liège, took the start. Only 17 finished. The course halfway turn point was the train station in Bastogne, chosen because of its convenience for race officials. Some tired riders abandoned the race in Bastogne and took the train back to Spa. Léon Houa, a Liège native, won the race after 10 hours and 48 minutes on the bike. The second-place finisher, Léon Lhoest, came in at 22 minutes, the third, Louis Rasquinet, at 44 minutes. Riders kept arriving for another five hours.

Houa won again the next year, over the same course, this time by a margin of a half hour. Houa concluded his third win, by seven minutes over Rasquinet. Frenchman Maurice Garin, who would later become the first winner of the Tour de France, finished fourth. After the inaugural three editions, the race was not organized for another 14 years, after which it was sometimes open only to amateurs and semi-professionals.

The race was resumed in 1908, with a start and finish in Liège for the first time. It was won by Frenchman André Trousselier. In 1909 the winner, Eugène Charlier, was disqualified because he had changed bikes. Victor Fastre was declared winner. The event was cancelled during World War I but resumed in 1919. The race was mainly won by Belgians, but started to attract more riders from Flanders, the bike-crazed northern part of Belgium, who began to dominate the event. Fleming Alfons Schepers gained three victories in the Interwar period.

Ardennes Classic
Liège–Bastogne–Liège had some interruptions during World War II, but was again a calendar-fixture as from 1945 and began to attract some of the stars of European cycling. In 1951 the race was added to the Challenge Desgrange-Colombo, the competition that combined cycling's greatest races at the time. Swiss Ferdinand Kübler won the race in 1951 and 1952. Belgian favourite Raymond Impanis became the race's eternal runner-up, with four second places but never a victory.

In the late 1950s Fred De Bruyne won the race three times in his first three participations, equalling the former record of Houa and Schepers. In 1957 two riders were declared winner. Germain Derijcke was first over the finish line, but he had crossed a closed level crossing. Derijcke had won by a three-minute lead and judges felt he had not gained that much time from illegally crossing the railway, thereby not disqualifying him. Officials compromised to promote second-place rider Frans Schoubben to first as well. In 1959 Liège–Bastogne–Liège became part of the Super Prestige, successor of the Desgrange-Colombo competition and early precursor of the UCI World Tour, making the Ardennes Classic one of the main cycling events of the year.

In 1969 began the era of cycling icon Eddy Merckx, who gained five victories, three of which consecutive, and a total of seven podium finishes. The 1971 race was run in appalling conditions, with snow and cold ravaging the peloton. Merckx gained one of his most memorable victories. The Belgian attacked in solo at 92 kilometers from the finish and soon had a five-minute advantage over his pursuiters. In a rare display, he suffered a sudden fatigue near the end and was joined by Georges Pintens. Pintens failed to distance a tired Merckx, and Merckx managed to outsprint his fellow Belgian to his second victory in the classic. 
 In 1972 the finish moved to Verviers, 15 km from Liège, but because of fans' protest, this was a one-year occasion. The edition was again won by Merckx. In 1975 The Cannibal sealed his fifth and final victory, making him the sole record-holder of La Doyenne.

French cycling great, Bernard Hinault won the race twice, both times in harrowing weather conditions. In 1977 Hinault made a late escape from a six-strong group including a faltering Eddy Merckx; three years later he won the epic contest of 1980 in torrential snowfall and glacial temperatures (see below).

In the 1980s, Italian classics specialist Moreno Argentin won the race four times, narrowly missing Merckx' record. Argentin also gained three victories in the sister classic La Flèche Wallonne, earning him the title of King of the Ardennes in his day.

Finish in Ans
In 1990, the Pesant Club Liégeois partnered with the Société du Tour de France, the organizer of cycling's flagships the Tour de France and Paris–Roubaix. The partnership led to a more professional organization, resulting in a complete overhauling of the race course: the start and finish moved to different locations in Liège and five new climbs were included.

In the late 1990s, Italians Michele Bartoli and Paolo Bettini continued a tradition of Italian victories in La Doyenne, with two wins each. In 1997, Bartoli and Laurent Jalabert made a decisive breakaway on the climb of La Redoute, 40 km from the finish. Both riders worked together and Bartoli broke away from the Frenchman on the steep slopes in the final kilometer of the race. Jalabert, a specialist of the Ardennes races, finished second two years in a row but failed to win the Doyenne. In 1999, Bartoli sought a third consecutive win, but his effort was thwarted by young Belgian Frank Vandenbroucke who controlled the race and stunned followers with his victory.

In 2005, Kazakh Alexander Vinokourov and German Jens Voigt broke away from the peloton 80 km from the end. Although the escape seemed unlikely to stay away in modern cycling, the two riders made it to the finish ahead of the peloton, with Vinokourov beating Voigt in the sprint.

Other memorable editions were the races of 2009 and 2010. In 2009, young Luxembourger Andy Schleck produced a solo breakaway to beat a strong field and win the race. In 2010, Alexander Vinokourov concluded his second victory by outsprinting his breakaway companion Alexander Kolobnev. The victory was controversial, not only because Vinokourov had recently returned to cycling after a doping ban, but also because it was suggested he had 'bought' the victory. Swiss magazine L'Illustré published e-mail correspondence between the winner and runner-up that suggests Vinokourov paid Kolobnev €100,000 not to contest the final sprint. Both riders were later charged with bribery by Belgian authorities.

In recent years, Spanish allrounder Alejandro Valverde won four times, all sprint victories of a select group at the finish.

Route

Present course

The route of Liège–Bastogne–Liège crosses the two eastern Walloon provinces, Liège and Luxembourg, from north to south and back. Its distance is more or less fixed at 250–260 km. The race starts in the center of Liège, after which the course follows a straightforward  route southwards to Bastogne, and a winding  route back to Liège.

The second half of the course contains numerous climbs, such as the Stockeu, Haute-Levée, La Redoute, and the Côte de la Roche-aux-Faucons, before finishing in Liège. In the final 15 km of the race, the course makes a remarkable transition from the meadowy and agrarian landscapes in the Ardennes to the post-industrial urban scenery of Liège.

Course changes
Until 1991, the race finished in Liège's city center. In 1992, the finish moved to the industrial suburb of Ans, on the northwestern side of the city. The steep Côte de Saint-Nicolas was included in the final kilometres, along with a final climb to the finish in Ans. The move implied profound changes to the character of the race, as climbers with a strong uphill-sprint in recent years often wait until the final stretches to launch their ultimate attack.

The route usually has some minor changes every year, with some climbs skipped and others added, but the traditional finale containing the Côte de La Redoute, Côte de la Roche-aux-Faucons and Côte de Saint-Nicolas was a fixture for 27 years.

In 2019, the finish line moved back into the centre of Liège, with a flat run-in towards the finish. Both the Côte de Saint-Nicolas and the final climb to Ans were thereby removed from the route. The Côte de la Roche-aux-Faucons was the final climb, at 15 km from the finish.

Race characteristics

Demands

Liège–Bastogne–Liège is considered one of the most arduous one-day races in the world because of its length and succession of steep climbs. Every edition, about a dozen climbs – ranging in length, gradient and difficulty – are addressed, offering opportunities to attack.
The British magazine Cycling Weekly stated: 
In purely physical terms, this is probably the toughest classic: the climbs are long, most of them are pretty steep as well, and they come up with depressing frequency in the final kilometres.
Four-times winner Moreno Argentin said:
Riders who win in Liège are what we call fondisti – men with a superior level of stamina. [The climb of] La Redoute is like the Mur de Huy in that it has to be tackled at pace, from the front of the peloton. The gradient is about 14 or 15 per cent, and it comes after 220 or 230 kilometers, so you don't have to be a genius to work out how tough it is. I remember that we used to go up with a maximum of 39 x 21 – it's not quite as steep as the Mur de Huy. A lot of riders mistakenly think you should attack on the hardest part, but in reality you hurt people on the slightly flatter section that comes after this.
Liège is a race of trial by elimination, where it's very unlikely that a breakaway can go clear and decide the race before the final . You need to be strong and at the same time clever and calculating — in this sense it's a complete test of a cyclist's ability.

Climbs

The most iconic hill is the Côte de La Redoute, the 2.0 km climb in Aywaille at an average gradient of 8.9% with slopes of over 20%. For a long time in the 1980s and 1990s La Redoute, at ca. 40 km from the finish, was the breaking point of the race and often the place where decisive breakaways were launched. In recent years the climb seems to have lost that particular role, as many riders are able to keep up with the pace on the climb and race favourites often wait until the last stages of the race to make a break.

In modern cycling, as in many bike races, the decisive stretches have evolved towards the final climbs of the day. The Côte de Saint-Nicolas is the last categorized climb of the race, with the top at 6 km from the finish in Ans. It is a precipitous and atypical climb because it is not part of the forested hills in the Ardennes, but located in the middle of the industrial suburbs of Liège along the Meuse river. In 2016, the organisers inserted the 600 m cobbled Côte de la Rue Naniot following the Côte de Saint-Nicolas, but preceding the finish in Ans. This turned out to be a one-off, however, as the race has not used the climb since.

Since the finish returned to Liège in 2019, the Côte de Saint-Nicolas has been removed from the route, and the decisive climbs are once again the Côte de la Redoute, Côte des Forges and Côte de la Roche-aux-Faucons.

Course changes are frequent from year to year. Climbs are sometimes cut or others included. These are the climbs in recent editions:

Weather
The weather in April is often unpredictable and the race has repeatedly been affected by harsh weather conditions. In 1919, 1957, 1980, and 2016 there was severe snowfall. The edition of 1980 was exceptionally hard: snow fell from the start and temperatures were near freezing point, leading commentators to call it  'Neige-Bastogne-Neige'  (Snow-Bastogne-Snow).

A feature published by the British magazine, Procycling in 2000, described the infamous race:

A cold wind that blew across Belgium brought snow flakes and then a heavy fall within moments of the race starting. (...) Riders struggled on, with hands to faces to keep a view of the road. The race was an anonymous mass of plastic jackets and windcheaters. Spectators stood in goggles like upmarket snowmen, red-faced in the bitterness. Within the hour some teams had barely a man left on the road. They pulled out two dozen at a time, men like Gibi Baronchelli and Giuseppe Saronni, Lucien Van Impe and Jean-René Bernaudeau.

Bernard Hinault, the winner, was one of just 21 riders to finish the race of 174 starters. It took three weeks for proper movement to return to two fingers of his right hand.

Ardennes Classics

Liège–Bastogne–Liège is the concluding race of the Ardennes Classics series, which includes La Flèche Wallonne. Both are organised by ASO.

The Flèche Wallonne ("Walloon Arrow"), although younger than Liège–Bastogne–Liège, was longtime considered the more prestigious event of the two Ardennes Classics, showing how prestige and importance of a race can sometimes change over time. At one time, Flèche Wallonne and Liège–Bastogne–Liège were run on successive days known as Le Weekend Ardennais, with Liège–Bastogne–Liège organized on Saturday and the Flèche Wallonne on Sunday.

Only seven riders have won both races in the same year: Spaniard Alejandro Valverde three times (2006, 2015 and 2017), Swiss Ferdinand Kübler twice (in 1951 and 1952), Belgians Stan Ockers (1955), Eddy Merckx (1972), and Philippe Gilbert (2011) and Italians Moreno Argentin (1991) and Davide Rebellin (2004).

In 2011 Belgian Philippe Gilbert won Liège–Bastogne–Liège, completing a unique streak of classics victories in a span of ten days. Gilbert had previously won the Brabantse Pijl, Amstel Gold Race and La Flèche Wallonne, thus achieving a historic quadruple of victories in the hilly classics of April. Gilbert beat Luxembourg brothers Fränck and Andy Schleck in a sprint of three.

Winners

Multiple winners
Active riders are in italic.

Wins per country

Liège–Bastogne–Liège Femmes 

In 2017, Liège–Bastogne–Liège Femmes in the UCI Women's World Tour was inaugurated, following the example of La Flèche Wallonne Féminine and Women's Amstel Gold Race. The first Liège–Bastogne–Liège Femmes, run on 23 April 2017, was won by Olympic champion Anna van der Breggen of the Netherlands.

At 135.5 km, the race is approximately half the distance of the men's event. Hence, it doesn't start in Liège but in Bastogne, from where it heads north past Liège to finish in Ans on the same location as the men's race. The route features four categorized climbs: the Côte de la Vecquée, Côte de La Redoute, Côte de la Roche aux faucons and Côte de Saint-Nicolas. The top of the last climb of Saint-Nicolas comes at 5.5 km from the finish.

Notes

References

External links

 Official website
 

 
Recurring sporting events established in 1892
1892 establishments in Belgium
Classic cycle races
Cycle races in Belgium
UCI ProTour races
UCI Road World Cup races
UCI World Tour races
Annual sporting events in Belgium
Sport in Liège Province
Sport in Luxembourg (Belgium)
Sport in Bastogne
Sport in Liège
Ans, Belgium
Spring (season) events in Belgium
Challenge Desgrange-Colombo races
Super Prestige Pernod races